Jeffery Raynard Sanders (born January 14, 1966) is an American retired professional basketball player who was selected by the Chicago Bulls in the first round (20th pick overall) of the 1989 NBA draft. Sanders played for the Bulls, Charlotte Hornets and Atlanta Hawks in four NBA seasons. In his NBA career, he appeared in 55 games and scored a total of 112 points. He played collegiately at Georgia Southern University. He also played for Fenerbahçe and Kombassan Konyaspor in Turkey.

He also appeared in the now defunct Metropolitan Basketball Association in the Philippines, as an import for the Batangas Blades, where he was listed as one of the league's top players. He also made an All-Star appearance for the 1998-1999 season and was a key contributor in the team's 1999 championship.

Sanders played for the Rockford Lightning of the Continental Basketball Association (CBA) during the 2001–02 season and was selected to the All-CBA First Team.

References

External links
NBA stats @ basketball-reference.com
Liga ACB profile

1966 births
Living people
20th-century African-American sportspeople
21st-century African-American people
African-American basketball players
Albany Patroons players
American expatriate basketball people in Italy
American expatriate basketball people in Spain
American expatriate basketball people in Turkey
American men's basketball players
Atlanta Hawks players
Basketball players from Augusta, Georgia
CB Estudiantes players
CB Valladolid players
Charlotte Hornets players
Chicago Bulls draft picks
Chicago Bulls players
Fenerbahçe men's basketball players
Fort Wayne Fury players
Georgia Southern Eagles men's basketball players
Grand Rapids Hoops players
Liga ACB players
Pallacanestro Virtus Roma players
Rockford Lightning players
Small forwards